O Man may refer to
Ô Man, another name for the Mantsi language
O'Man, the third hole in the 2015 PGA Championship

See also

Oman, a country on the Arabian peninsula
Ohman, a surname